9th Brigade may refer to:

India
 9th Indian Infantry Brigade, a unit during the World War II
 9th (Sirhind) Brigade, a unit during World War I
 9th (Secunderabad) Cavalry Brigade, a unit the World War I

United Kingdom
 9th Armoured Brigade (United Kingdom) 
 9th Cavalry Brigade (United Kingdom)
 9th Infantry Brigade (United Kingdom)
 9th Mounted Brigade (United Kingdom)
 IX Brigade, Royal Horse Artillery

Other units
 9th Brigade (Australia) 
 9th Canadian Infantry Brigade
 9th Guards Brigade (Croatia)
 9th Light Armoured Marine Brigade (France) 
 9th Infantry Brigade (Greece)
 Oded Brigade, Israel
 9th Brigade (New Zealand)